Artemisia serrata is a North American species in the sunflower family, with the common name  serrate-leaved sage or saw-tooth wormwood. It is native to the north-central part of the United States (Iowa, Illinois, Michigan, Wisconsin, Minnesota, North Dakota, with isolated populations in New York State).

Description
Artemisia serrata is a perennial occasionally reaching a height of 300 cm (10 feet). It has up to 5 stems and bicolor leaves (white and green). It has many small yellow flower heads. The species tends to grow in grasslands and barren areas on high plateaus.

References

External links
Wisconsin Plants, Wisconsin State Herbarium

serrata
Flora of the Northern United States
Plants described in 1818
Perennial plants
Flora of the United States
Flora of North America